Toyotomi Yosui-ike  is an earthfill dam located in Kyoto Prefecture in Japan. The dam is used for irrigation. The catchment area of the dam is 3.9 km2. The dam impounds about 11  ha of land when full and can store 945 thousand cubic meters of water. The construction of the dam was completed in 1952.

See also
List of dams in Japan

References

Dams in Kyoto Prefecture